Amanita mairei is a species of fungi belonging to the family Amanitaceae.

It is native to Eurasia and Northern America.

The species is named after French botanist and mycologist René Maire.

References

mairei